Véronique Vendell (born Véronique Duraffourd, 21 July 1942) is a French actress.  She appeared mainly in French and German productions, but had roles in both Peter Glenville's Becket and Sam Peckinpah's Cross of Iron and its sequel Breakthrough.

The two movies she appears in with Peter O'Toole, she plays his lover or would-be lover: these are Becket and The Night of the Generals. She also had a prominent role in Code 7, Victim 5.

Filmography
 Becket (1964)
 Code 7, Victim 5! (1964)
 The Night of the Generals (1967)
 Barbarella (1968)
 Mayerling (1968)
 The Young Tigers of Hong Kong (1969)
  (1970)
 Holiday Report (1971)
 La supertestimone (1971)
 The Girl from Hong Kong (1973)
 Cross of Iron (1977)
 Breakthrough (1979)

External links
 

1942 births
Living people
French film actresses
20th-century French actresses
Actors from Montpellier